Robert Wayne "Robbie" Tallas (born March 20, 1973) is a Canadian former professional ice hockey goaltender. He played in the National Hockey League (NHL) with the Boston Bruins and Chicago Blackhawks between 1996 and 2001.

Playing career
Tallas played in 99 NHL games and compiled a record of 28 wins, 42 losses, and 10 ties. He has been serving as the goaltending coach for the Florida Panthers since August 2009.

He came out of retirement for one game on March 3, 2013 as a backup goalie for the Florida Panthers. Then, exactly two years later, on March 3, 2015, during a game against the Toronto Maple Leafs, both Panthers goaltenders (Roberto Luongo and Al Montoya) were injured during play. Montoya stayed in the game, and Tallas quickly went to the dressing room to dress as his emergency backup. He warmed up in the tunnel, but Luongo was able to re-dress and return to the game, sparing Tallas from action. In both instances, Tallas had suited up, registered on the official team roster, and could have been called on the ice as a replacement but ended up not playing because the originally planned goaltender returned before a replacement was needed.

Tallas was also part of the coaching staff of Italy men's national ice hockey team during the 2019 IIHF World Championship.

Career statistics

Regular season and playoffs

References

External links
 

1973 births
Living people
Boston Bruins players
Canadian ice hockey coaches
Canadian ice hockey goaltenders
Charlotte Checkers (1993–2010) players
Chicago Blackhawks players
Chicago Wolves (IHL) players
EC Red Bull Salzburg players
Florida Panthers coaches
HPK players
Italy men's national ice hockey team coaches
Norfolk Admirals players
Providence Bruins players
Seattle Thunderbirds players
Ice hockey people from Edmonton
Undrafted National Hockey League players
Wilkes-Barre/Scranton Penguins players